Tetrataenium nepalense is a flowering plant in the carrot family Apiaceae. The species is called Nepal cowparsnip in the book on Traditional Chinese Medicine.

Uses
The species is common in the Sikkim and Darjeeling districts of India. Called chimphing in the Nepali language, it is considered medicinal for stomach ailments and its seeds are ground with tomato and taken as a relish, especially with boiled vegetables.

References

Apioideae